Matea Pletikosić (born 24 April 1998) is a Croatian-born Montenegrin handball player for ŽRK Budućnost and the Montenegrin national team.

She played for Croatia in youth categories, but chose to play for Montenegro on a senior level. She represented Croatia at the 2015 European Women's Youth Handball Championship in North Macedonia.

She represented Montenegro at the 2020 European Women's Handball Championship.

Individual awards 
 All-Star Centre Back of the EHF U-17 European Championship: 2015

References

External links

Living people
1998 births
People from Sinj
Croatian female handball players
Montenegrin female handball players
Olympic handball players of Montenegro
Handball players at the 2020 Summer Olympics
Montenegrin people of Croatian descent
Expatriate handball players
Montenegrin expatriate sportspeople in Slovenia